Shapkin (from шапка meaning cap) is a Russian masculine surname, its feminine counterpart is Shapkina. It may refer to
Timofey Shapkin (born 1885), Russian military commander
Roman Shapkin (born 1971), Russian football coach and a former player
Yury Shapkin (born 1987), Russian freestyle skier

Russian-language surnames